Enzio Rafael Reuter (30 March 1867, in Turku – 11 February 1951, in Helsinki) was a Finnish entomologist who specialised in Lepidoptera.

He wrote Über die Palpen der Rhopalocera: Ein Beitrag zur Erkenntnis der verwandtschaftlichen Beziehungen unter den Tagfaltern, an important work on the classification of lepidoptera in which some higher level taxa are erected. 

Reuter was a cytologist and student of phylogenetics. His collection is conserved in the Natural History Museum of Helsinki.

Reuter was a correspondent with and admirer of the German Darwinist Ernst Haeckel:
"In 1868 Haeckel had given his first edition of the natural history of creation and this work, more than any other, made Darwinism to a generally accepted world view… Reuter’s dissertation carries a label of its time. It is a typical phylogenetic handling, inspired by Haeckel’s spirit that at the close of the century totally dominated the biological research."

Literature
Federley, H. 1951. Enzio Rafael Reuter. Memoranda Soc. Fauna Flora Fennica, 27: 170–180.
Howard, L. O. 1930. History of applied Entomology (Somewhat Anecdotal). Smiths. Miscell. Coll. 84 X+1–564.
Osborn, H. 1952. A Brief History of Entomology Including Time of Demosthenes and Aristotle to Modern Times with over Five Hundred Portraits. Columbus, Ohio, The Spahr & Glenn Company. Pp. 1–303.
Silfverberg, H. 1995. [Reuter, E.]  Memoranda Societatis pro Fauna et Flora Fennica 71:39–49.

Psocoptera
 

 Pseudopsocus fusciceps, described in 1893

References

External links
Biography in Finnish. Portrait.

Finnish entomologists
Finnish lepidopterists
1867 births
1951 deaths